Hugh Fraser may refer to:

Entertainment
 Hugh Fraser (actor) (born 1945), contemporary English actor
 Hugh Fraser (musician) (born 1958), Canadian jazz trombonist and composer
 Hugh Fraser (animator) (1904–1994), American animator on films and TV series
 Hugh Fraser, founder of Fraser's Magazine with William Maginn

Politics
 Hugh Fraser (Australian politician) (1837–1900), politician in the Colony of South Australia
 Hugh Fraser (diplomat) (1837–1894), British diplomat to Japan
 Hugh Fraser (colonial administrator) (1891–1944), British colonial administrator
 Hugh Fraser (British politician) (1918–1984), British Conservative politician
 Hugh Fraser, 1st Baron Fraser of Allander (1903–1966), British peer and former Chairman of House of Fraser
 Hugh Fraser, 1st Lord Lovat, Scottish peer
 Hugh Fraser, 3rd Lord Lovat (1494–1544), Scottish peer
 Hugh Fraser, 5th Lord Lovat, Scottish peer
 Hugh Fraser, 9th Lord Lovat (1649–1672), hereditary chief of the Clan Fraser
 Sir Hugh Fraser, 2nd Baronet (1936–1987), former Chairman of House of Fraser

Other
 Hugh Fraser (athlete) (born 1952), Canadian Olympic sprinter and Judge
 Hugh Fraser (Australian judge) (born 1957), Appeals Court justice at the Supreme Court of Queensland
 Hugh Fraser (East India Company officer) (1808–1858), British military officer in India in the 1850s
Hugh Fraser (British judge) (1860–1927), British judge.
 Hugh Fraser (retailer) (1815–1873), founder of House of Fraser
 Hugh Fraser, Baronet of Allander (disambiguation)

See also
 Hugh Frazer (disambiguation)